The 1848 United States presidential election in Wisconsin was held on November 7, 1848 as part of the 1848 United States presidential election. It was the first presidential election held in Wisconsin since its admission to the Union on May 29th, earlier the same year. Democratic candidate Lewis Cass won the state with 38% of the vote, carrying the state's 4 electoral votes.

With 26.6% of the popular vote, Wisconsin would prove to be Van Buren's third strongest state after Vermont and Massachusetts.

The 1848 election began a trend in Wisconsin where the state would vote the same as neighboring Iowa, as the two states have voted in lockstep with each other on all but 6 occasions - 1892, 1924, 1940, 1976, 2004, and 2020. This was the last time until 1988 that Wisconsin would back a losing Democrat in a presidential election.

Results

See also
 United States presidential elections in Wisconsin

References

Wisconsin
1848 Wisconsin elections
1848